The Edgewater Branch was a branch of the New York, Susquehanna and Western Railway (NYS&W) that ran about  through eastern Bergen County, New Jersey in the United States. Starting from a rail junction at the Little Ferry Yard (in Ridgefield), it went east through the Edgewater Tunnel to Undercliff (as Edgewater was once known) to the Hudson Waterfront.

History
The New York, Susquehanna and Western Railway handled passenger and freight traffic from the coal mining region in the Lackawanna Valley in and around Scranton, Pennsylvania through northern New Jersey. While it had a line running along the foot of the western slope of Hudson Palisades that terminated in Jersey City north of Marion Junction it owned no right of way through Bergen Hill. The railroad paid substantial fees to both the Pennsylvania Railroad (PRR) (for passenger trains) and the Delaware, Lackawanna and Western (DL&W) (for freight service) to use their lines to terminals on the North River.

The Hudson River Railroad and Terminal Company was incorporated as a New York Susquehanna and Western Railway subsidiary in 1892. The NYSW developed a terminal on what had once been a coal yard for oceangoing ships along the Hudson River shore. At the time the Erie Railroad held a controlling interest in the line. In 1907, Erie Terminals Railroad took control of the Edgewater and Fort Lee Railroad which ran to the Hudson County line and connected with the New Jersey Shore Line Railroad, eventually becoming part of a Belt Line along the shore.

Extensive railyards and car float operations supported the development of industries which dominated the shoreline for much of the 20th century. Among them were Alcoa Aluminum, Ford Motor Company, Lever Brothers, Valvoline Oil Company, and Archer-Daniels-Midland. Eventually the factories closed as industry globalized, facilities became obsolete, and shipping in the port shifted to trucking and containerization. The closure of Ford's Edgewater Assembly Plant in 1955 saw the loss of one of the line's biggest clients.

Edgewater Tunnel

The Edgewater Tunnel is a former railroad tunnel through Bergen Hill,  the Hudson Palisades. Originally opened in 1894, it was built to gain access to the Hudson River waterfront. The right-of-way was removed from service in about 1992 and the track was removed shortly thereafter.

A pipeline now runs through the tunnel between Hess facilities in Bogota and Edgewater. A power cable, part of the Hudson Project, running from a Bergen Generating Station substation through the tunnel and under the Hudson to Midtown Manhattan, was completed in 2013.

Status
The branch line remains in partial use between Undercliff Junction in Ridgefield and the bridge at US Route 1/9 in Fairview east of Route 1/9, but trackage through the cut and tunnel was removed in October 1992. The right-of-way itself has not been abandoned.

During the 1980s and early 1990s, planners and government officials realized that alternative transportation systems needed to be put in place to relieve increasing congestion along the Hudson Waterfront It was decided that the most efficient and cost-effective system to meet the growing demands of the area would be a light rail system. When a new transportation network was proposed, it was suggested that the tunnel be used for what became the Hudson-Bergen Light Rail, but that idea was ultimately rejected in favor of the Weehawken Tunnel. The Hudson Waterfront/River Road corridor has seen extensive residential and commercial development and subsequent congestion since that time, and further studies of a more comprehensive transportation strategy have been conducted.

A station along the line at the Vince Lombardi Park & Ride is part of the proposed Passaic–Bergen–Hudson Transit Project.

See also
New Jersey Midland Railway
New York, Susquehanna and Western Railway passenger map (1939-1966 map)
Timeline of Jersey City area railroads
List of bridges, tunnels, and cuts in Hudson County, New Jersey
Northern Branch Corridor Project

Notes

References

External links
 Topoquest: USGS Map
 Wikimapia Fairview-Tunnel-Ventilation-Shaft
 Map: Hudson River terminals c.1950

New York, Susquehanna and Western Railway
Fairview, Bergen County, New Jersey
Edgewater, New Jersey
Railroad tunnels in New Jersey
Buildings and structures in Bergen County, New Jersey